Franziska Tesaurus is the richest Gepid royal tomb  found in Romania. It was found while searching the Potaissa Roman castrum at Turda in 1996, by Mihai Bărbulescu, between the secondary sewer and the frigidarium. The inventory of the tomb was composed of: polyhedral golden rings with almandine, hemicyclical gold plated brooch, gold-plated silver belt with gold garments and almandine, amber necklace, embroidery decorations, bone comb, nomadic mirror, silver shoe belts, and small fragments of clothing.

It was put on display on 3 April 2007 in Turda History Museum.

See also 
 Apahida necropolis
 Romania in the Early Middle Ages
 Gepids
 Kingdom of the Gepids

External links 
 Article
 Cimec.ro, RAN Code 55268.01, Franziskaz

Archaeological sites in Romania
Buildings and structures in Cluj County
Gepids
Tombs in Romania